Sanne Verhagen (born 24 August 1992) is a Dutch judoka. She competed at the 2016 Summer Olympics in the women's 57 kg event, in which she was eliminated in the second round by Dorjsürengiin Sumiyaa. She also competed in the women's 57 kg event at the 2020 Summer Olympics held in Tokyo, Japan.

References

External links
 
 

1992 births
Living people
Dutch female judoka
Olympic judoka of the Netherlands
Judoka at the 2016 Summer Olympics
Judoka at the 2020 Summer Olympics
European Games competitors for the Netherlands
Judoka at the 2015 European Games
Judoka at the 2019 European Games
21st-century Dutch women